Rugby Colorno is an Italian rugby union club currently competing in the Italian domestic league Top10. They are based in Colorno (Province of Parma), in Emilia-Romagna. They were founded in 1975.

History

Rugby Colorno was founded in 1975 as an Under-19 team, by Paolo Pavesi, to participate in the Italian Junior Championships. They were a group of young beginners inexperienced in the area, the pitch borrowed from the parish, with open air changing rooms and using buses to travel to matches. They won promotion to the Top12 in the 2018-19 season.

For the 2019–20 season, fly-half Leonardo Mantelli is a permit player for Zebre in the Pro14.

Anthem 
The club's official anthem, "Non sarai mai solo" by the DJ and composer Hunterwolf and the songwriter Jacopo Mack Rosa has been released in late 2021. The song also features the mezzosoprano Carling Chiu and the video is directed by Danilo Barozzi.

Current squad

The Colorno squad for the 2022–23 season is:

Club Partnerships

Rugby Colorno is in partnership with Premiership Rugby side Leicester Tigers. The partnership helps to drive development of rugby across the world along with building sustainable links between players, partners and communities.

Former players

The following players have previously represented Rugby Colorno:

 Failaga Afamasaga
 Aldo Birchall
 Alessandro Castagnoli
 Daniele Di Giulio
 Filippo Frati
 Alessio Galante
 Massimo Giovanelli
 Carl Manu
 Samuele Pace
 Jacopo Sarto
 Federico Zani
  Dorin Tică

References

External links
 Official website
 Official Twitter

Italian rugby union teams
Rugby clubs established in 1975
Province of Parma